Rati Andronikashvili (born 19 March 2001) is a Georgian player for the UCAM Murcia of the Liga ACB.

He is a native of Tbilisi, the capital of Georgia.

Career
Andronikashvili joined BC Rustavi of the Georgian Superliga in 2020. He averaged 7.0 points, 1.0 rebound, and 1.0 assist per game.
In May 2020, Andronikashvili signed with Creighton Bluejays men's basketball of the NCAA Division I  college basketball in the United States. At that time, he was graded as a 95th and ranked as the No. 64 overall  prospect and No. 13 point guard in the 2020 recruiting class.

On November 6, 2020, Andronikashvili tore an ACL in practice, forcing him to miss the season.

On November 27, 2022, he signed with UCAM Murcia of the Liga ACB.

National team career
Andronikashvili has been a member of the Georgian national basketball team. In the past, he had been a member of the Georgian national under-18 basketball team and the Georgian national under-16 basketball team. At the 2019 FIBA U18 European Championship Division B, he averaged 17.4 points, 5.9 rebounds and 4.0 assists.

References

External links
Creighton Bluejays bio

2001 births
Living people
Expatriate basketball people from Georgia (country) in Spain
Men's basketball players from Georgia (country)
Point guards
Shooting guards
Basketball players from Tbilisi